Dmitriy Andreyevich Furmanov (7 November 1891, Sereda – 15 March 1926, Moscow) was a Russian writer, revolutionary and military officer.

Biography
He was born to a peasant family. For three years, he attended the Realschule in Kineshma. It was there that he developed an interest in literature. He pursued his interests at the Imperial Moscow University but, after graduating in 1915, failed the state examinations.

During World War I, he served with the Red Cross. It was there he met and married . In 1917, he joined the Union of Socialists-Revolutionaries Maximalists, then became an Anarchist. He fled Moscow following the Kornilov affair and settled in Ivanovo, where he provided support to the October Revolution. The following year, he went to the Eastern Front to serve as a political worker. There, he was instrumental in helping to quash a rebellion. After that he went to Kuban, where he was seriously injured.

After his recovery, in 1921, he returned to Moscow, where he was employed by several organizations dealing with military publications and he completed his education at Moscow University. After 1923, he worked for "Gosizdat", a publisher of propaganda.

He died of meningitis and is buried in Novodevichy Cemetery. In 1941, the town of Sereda, where he was born, was renamed Furmanov after him.

Despite the affair with his wife, he is best known for his novel about Chapayev. It was translated into English by George and Jeanette Kittell and issued by Foreign Languages Publishing House in 1940.

Awards 
Order of the Red Banner. (1922)

See also

Chapayev and Void (novel)

External links
The Chapayev book

1891 births
1926 deaths
People from Furmanov
People from Nerekhtsky Uyezd
Bolsheviks
Soviet novelists
Soviet male writers
20th-century male writers
Soviet military personnel of the Russian Civil War
Neurological disease deaths in the Soviet Union
Infectious disease deaths in the Soviet Union
Deaths from meningitis
Burials at Novodevichy Cemetery